The Charlotte mayoral election of 2001 was held in tuesday November 6, 2001 to elect a Mayor of Charlotte, North Carolina.  It was won by Republican incumbent Pat McCrory, who won a fourth consecutive term by defeating Democratic nominee  Ella Scarborough in the general election.

Primaries

Pat McCrory won the Republican nomination unopposed.

General election

Footnotes

2001
Charlotte
2001 North Carolina elections
November 2001 events in the United States